Lundin Links railway station served the village of Lundin Links, Fife, Scotland from 1857 to 1965 on the Fife Coast Railway.

History 
The station opened on 11 August 1857 by the East of Fife Railway.

The station had one platform to the north of the running line, there were two sidings behind the platform forming a small goods yard able to accommodate a limited range of goods including live stock, they were unable to deal with vehicles needing to be loaded on trains, the yard was equipped with a 1½ ton crane.

A camping coach was positioned here by the Scottish Region from 1953 to 1963, and there were two coaches here from 1956 to 1961.

The station closed to passengers on 6 September 1965. The line closed to goods traffic on 18 July 1966.

References

External links 
 

Disused railway stations in Fife
Former North British Railway stations
Railway stations in Great Britain opened in 1857
Railway stations in Great Britain closed in 1965
1857 establishments in Scotland
1965 disestablishments in Scotland
Beeching closures in Scotland